Intimism was an artistic movement in the late 19th-century and early 20th-century that involved the depiction of banal yet personal domestic scenes, particularly those within domestic interiors. Intimism was most notably practiced by French painters Édouard Vuillard and Pierre Bonnard after the 1899 disbandment of Les Nabis. Edgar Degas and Felix Vallotton have also been characterized as intimists. The main interest of the intimists was their own intimate life such as portraying their family members instead of focusing on more general topics.

French art critic Camille Mauclair defined Intimism as:
While the movement is often associated with Impressionism, the Intimists diverged from the Impressionists in abandoning a focus on formal accuracy in depiction of light, color, and perspective in favor of emphasized texture, exaggerated palette, and merged figure and ground.

The term "intimism" has since been extended to artists outside of the historical period who utilize similar techniques. Intimist film, for example, refers to cinema that utilizes domestic narratives or places focus on the mundane. Brian Fallon referred to Veronica Bolay as an intimiste.

References 

Art movements
French art movements
Art movements in Europe
Les Nabis